

Edgar (or Eadgar; died  930) was a medieval Bishop of Hereford. He was consecrated in between 888 and 890 and died between 930 and 931.

Citations

References

External links
 

Bishops of Hereford
9th-century English bishops
10th-century English bishops
930s deaths
8th-century births